Eschiva of Bures, also known as Eschiva II (died in or after 1187), was Princess of Galilee in the Kingdom of Jerusalem from 1158 to 1187.

Parentage

Eschiva's parentage is uncertain. Historian Martin Rheinheimer proposes that she was the daughter of either Elinand (who was Prince of Galilee between about 1144 and 1148), or of Radulf of Issy (who was a nephew of William I of Bures, Prince of Galilee). Historian Hans Eberhard Mayer refutes Rheinheimer's view, saying that William I of Bures and his second wife, Ermengarde of Ibelin, were Eschiva's parents. If Mayer is right, Eschiva must have been born after William and Ermengarde married around 1135.

Marriages

Eschiva was given in marriage to Walter of Saint Omer who was first mentioned as Prince of Galilee in March 1159. Mayer proposes that King Baldwin III of Jerusalem arranged the marriage because he wanted to merge the concurring claims of the Bures and Saint-Omer families to Galilee. Holding the largest fief in the kingdom, the princes of Galilee were to send 100 knights to the royal army.

Walter died in early 1174. The widowed Eschiva soon married to Raymond III of Tripoli. According to the contemporaneous Ernoul, Baldwin III's successor, Amalric, arranged the marriage.

References

Sources 

 
 
 

 

Countesses of Tripoli
Remarried royal consorts
12th-century women rulers